Las aventuras de Tremendo is a 1986 Argentine film directed by Enrique Cahen Salaberry and written by Salvador Valverde Calvo. The cinematography was performed by Leonardo Rodríguez Solís

Cast
 Jesús Berenguer
 Juancito Díaz
 Monica Gonzaga
 Guido Gorgatti
 Sebastián Miranda
 Mónica Núñez Cortés
 Julio Pelieri
 Carlos Rivkin
 Fernando Siro
 Tremendo
 Tristán (actor)
  Manuel Martin (bebe)

External links
 

Argentine adventure comedy films
1986 films
1980s Spanish-language films
Films directed by Enrique Cahen Salaberry
1980s Argentine films